The 1992 Centennial Cup is the 22nd Junior "A" 1992 ice hockey National Championship for the Canadian Junior A Hockey League.

The Centennial Cup was competed for by the winners of the Doyle Cup, Anavet Cup, Central Canadian Championship, the Eastern Canadian Champion and a host city.

The tournament was hosted by the St. James Canadians and Winnipeg, Manitoba.

The Playoffs
The Thunder Bay Flyers coached by Dave Siciliano placed first overall in the 1991–92 United States Hockey League season to win the Anderson Cup, but were defeated by three games to one versus the Dubuque Fighting Saints in the league's playoffs semifinals. The Flyers hosted the Dudley Hewitt Cup tournament in Thunder Bay. They placed second during the round-robin, defeated the Joliette Nationals by a 5–2 score in the semifinals, then defeated the Kanata Valley Lasers by a 5–1 score in the finals. At the Centennial Cup, the Flyers completed the round-robin with two wins and two losses, then defeated the Halifax Mooseheads by an 8–1 score to reach the finals versus the Winkler Flyers. Siciliano recalled in a 2021 interview that, Winkler was "a bigger and more physical team and wanted to wear their black sweaters" as an intimidation tactic. As the home team with the first choice of colours, Siciliano's Flyers wore dark red jerseys and forced Winkler to change into light-coloured jerseys. Siciliano felt that worked in his team's favour as Winkler took penalties early in the game, and his team won by a 10-1 score giving Siciliano a second Centennial Cup championship.

Round Robin

Results
Thunder Bay Flyers defeated St. James Canadians 7-4
Winkler Flyers defeated Halifax Mooseheads 5-3
Vernon Lakers defeated Thunder Bay Flyers 5-4 in Double Overtime
Halifax Mooseheads defeated Vernon Lakers 6-4
Winkler Flyers defeated St. James 8-4
Vernon Lakers defeated St. James 9-3
Thunder Bay Flyers defeated Winkler 9-2
St. James Canadians defeated Halifax 10-4
Halifax Mooseheads defeated Thunder Bay 9-3
Vernon Lakers defeated Winkler 5-3 for the Abbott Cup

Semi-finals and Final

Awards
Most Valuable Player: Scott Longstaff (Vernon Lakers)
Top Scorer: Scott Longstaff (Vernon Lakers)
Most Sportsmanlike Player: Mike Figliomeni (Thunder Bay Flyers)

All-Star Team
Forward
Scott Longstaff (Vernon Lakers)
Michal Sup (Vernon Lakers)
Glen Thornborough (Winkler Flyers)
Defence
Dane Litke (Winkler Flyers)
Jason Wright (Thunder Bay Flyers)
Goal
Chris Burns (Thunder Bay Flyers)

Roll of League Champions
AJHL: Olds Grizzlys
BCHL: Vernon Lakers
CJHL: Kanata Valley Lasers
MJHL: Winkler Flyers
MJAHL: Halifax Mooseheads
NOJHL: Powassan Hawks
PCJHL: Prince George Spruce Kings
QPJHL: Joliette Nationals
SJHL: Melfort Mustangs

See also
Canadian Junior A Hockey League
Royal Bank Cup
Anavet Cup
Doyle Cup
Dudley Hewitt Cup
Fred Page Cup
Abbott Cup
Mowat Cup

References

External links
Royal Bank Cup Website

1992
Centennial Cup 1992
Cup
1992 in Manitoba
1990s in Winnipeg